ITF-1, also known as Yui, was an amateur radio cubesat built by Tsukuba University of Japan.

It had a size of 100x100x100mm (without antenna) and was built around a standard 1U cubesat bus. The satellite's primary purpose was the raising awareness of space by providing an easily decoded signal to amateur radio receivers. ITF-1's mission was unsuccessful; no signal from the spacecraft was ever received, and it reentered Earth's atmosphere on 29 June 2014.

See also

List of CubeSats

References

External links
 Project page
 ITF-1 page on Amsat - amateur radio community
 Orbital data of ITF-1 
 Gunters space page on ITF-1

Spacecraft launched in 2014
Spacecraft which reentered in 2014
2014 in Japan
Satellites of Japan
Amateur radio satellites